Popeye the Sailor (originally titled as Popeye the Sailor with Betty Boop) is a 1933 animated short produced by Fleischer Studios and distributed by Paramount Publix Corporation. While billed as a Betty Boop cartoon, it was produced as a vehicle for Popeye in his debut animated appearance.

Summary 
The cartoon begins with stock film footage of newspapers rolling off a printing press. The front page of one of the newspapers appears, with a headline declaring that Popeye has become a movie star. The camera zooms in on the illustration of Popeye, which then comes to life, as Popeye (voiced by Billy Costello) sings about his amazing prowess in his signature song "I'm Popeye the Sailor Man".

On land with his nemesis Bluto (voiced by William Pennell), the two sailors vie for the affections of Olive Oyl (voiced by Bonnie Poe). Popeye takes Olive Oyl to a carnival and pays the peacock 10¢ and Bluto blows off all of the peacock's feathers. They play two games, the high striker and African dodger, with Popeye "winning" both times and then they watch Betty Boop doing the hula. Popeye jumps up on stage, wraps the bearded lady's beard around his waist for a grass skirt, and dances with Betty, mimicking her movements. He is then bit by a snake, but then tranquilizes it with his pipe.

Bluto then abducts Olive Oyl and ties her to a railroad track, using the track itself as "ropes", in order to cause a train wreck to kill Olive, where a train is approaching. Popeye fights Bluto, but initially loses, but then eats spinach and then punches Bluto, causing him to get trapped in a nailed coffin. He then punches the approaching engine and its baggage car and coaches in the "face", and wrecks the whole train in a crushing halt and sparing Olive's life, because of the can of spinach he ate.

Production notes 
 This short also introduces the song "I'm Popeye the Sailor Man", written by Sammy Lerner, loosely based on the first two lines of the "Pirate King" song in Gilbert and Sullivan's operetta, The Pirates of Penzance. It would eventually become Popeye's theme song, with a portion of its instrumental appearing over the opening credits. For this cartoon, and at least one following it, the opening credits theme was an extended instrumental of "The Sailor's Hornpipe" (of which only the first bar was used in the later cartoons) followed by a vocal variation on "Strike Up the Band (Here Comes a Sailor)" substituting the words "for Popeye the Sailor" in the latter phrase. The song was sung twice in the opening credits of this cartoon, first by a deep-voiced singer who sounds like Bluto voice, and then by Mae Questel (as the voice of Betty Boop). It was also heard in the science-fiction film Alien Resurrection (1997) when it is whistled by Dom Vriess. "Barnacle Bill" is used as the recurring theme for Bluto. 
 The animation sequence with Popeye singing was reused in the Screen Songs cartoon Let's Sing with Popeye.
 The locomotive featured is a 2-4-2 (American type steam locomotive). These types of steam trains with their wheel arrangement were used most common on U.S. railroads from the 1830s through 1928.
 It is the only Popeye the Sailor with Betty Boop short in a Betty Boop cartoon in the Paramount Pictures series, and the only Betty Boop cartoon not currently owned by Melange Pictures/Paramount Global as it is part of the Popeye animated catalog owned by Turner/Warner Bros. Discovery.
 Popeye was one of several newspaper cartoons that the Fleischers animated (the others included Otto Soglow's The Little King and Carl Thomas Anderson's Henry). In order to increase the chance of Popeye's success, the short was billed as a Betty Boop cartoon, though she is only featured briefly. The short has also been released as Betty Boop Meets Popeye the Sailor.

Edits 
 When shown on MeTV in 2021, the African dodger scene was cut.

References

External links 
 
 

Popeye the Sailor theatrical cartoons
Betty Boop cartoons
1930s American animated films
1933 animated films
1933 short films
American black-and-white films
American comedy short films
Animated crossover films
Fleischer Studios short films
Paramount Pictures short films
Short films directed by Dave Fleischer
1930s English-language films
American animated short films
American crossover films